Chris Thompson (born 8 December 1971 from York) is a former English professional darts player who currently playing in Professional Darts Corporation (PDC) events. He uses the nickname Hitman.

Career

Thompson played county darts for Yorkshire for many years. In 1997, he reached the quarter-finals of the revived News of the World Darts Championship. His best result on the British Darts Organisation circuit was a British Open semi-final in 2004.

Thompson joined the PDC in 2007. At the 2008 UK Open, he defeated Adrian Gray, Steve Maish and Brendan Dolan on the way to the quarter-finals, where he was beaten 5–10 by Vincent van der Voort.

Thompson achieved some notable results on the 2010 PDC Pro Tour, reaching the semi-finals in two events. In one of those events, in Las Vegas, he defeated Phil Taylor in the quarter-finals before losing to Simon Whitlock.

As a result of his strong performances in 2010, he qualified for his first PDC World Championship in 2011 via the Players Championship Order of Merit. He lost 1–3 to Colin Osborne in the first round.

Thompson is not a full-time professional darts player – he works for a legal firm in York. He supports Leeds United.

Thompson Quit the PDC in 2013.

World Championship Results

PDC
 2011: 1st Round (lost to Colin Osborne 1–3)

References

External links

Profile for Chris Thompson

1971 births
Living people
English darts players
Professional Darts Corporation former tour card holders
British Darts Organisation players